Emperatriz is a Venezuelan telenovela written by José Ignacio Cabrujas, produced by Marte Televisión and broadcast on Venevisión in 1990.

Marina Baura and Raúl Amundaray starred as the protagonists with Eduardo Serrano and Martín Lantigua as antagonists.

Synopsis 

Emperatriz Jurado is a young woman of humble origin, in love with Anselmo Lander, who marries Alma Rosa Corona, a woman rich in interest without knowing it. She and Anselmo have a daughter, Esther, but Anselmo takes her away to raise her in his marriage and takes her away from Emperatriz, whom the girl forgets. Esther grew up with her two half sisters, Endrina and Elena.

Anselmo sends Emperatriz to live in New York to hide her; but every time it makes him get less money. She becomes pregnant again by him; But the hardships she is going through make her lose the child, there she meets another Venezuelan loser named Leonidas Leon, and they plan to return together to Venezuela to rebuild their lives.

Willing to take revenge, Emperatriz  involves Anselmo in a drug scandal, which is why his wife dies of a heart attack. Anselmo, between guilt and shame, commits suicide.
Empress and her husband manage to ascend socially.

The three girls are left in charge of Don Justo Corona who is the uncle of Anselmo's deceased wife, it is this man who, devastated, takes hatred of the girls for being daughters of the man who made his niece suffer so much and decides to separate them, the middle daughter Endrina goes to live with Anselmo's sister, La Gata Barroso, Elena is adopted by some foreigners who give her the same name but in English Helen; and Esther (Nohely Arteaga) is sent to boarding school in England.

Some time later, Emperatriz discovers that her real father is Don Justo Corona, who hates her for what happened with Alma Rosa and wants revenge on her. As if that were not enough, another nephew of Justo, a high-ranking naval officer, falls in love with Alexander the Great.

The years go by Esther escapes from boarding school and becomes a prostitute, Endrina is raped by the husband of the barroso cat and has a son (José lost), who she does not want to see, her desire is to take revenge on the Empress, she goes to Caracas where she becomes a model, her name is changed and she becomes the Empress' exclusive model to destroy her and thus avenge the death of her parents, Helen returns to Venezuela she had blocked from her memory the memories as a child with her sisters, little by little. remembering everything.

Emperatriz manages to get Esther back and win her heart; but the girl falls in love with her stepfather and he reciprocates her, for which both feel guilt towards Empress.

Emperatriz is a continuing saga, which tells the story of undying love, passion, heinous crimes and, most of all, terrible vengeance. Emperatriz Jurado is a woman blinded by greed and a thirst for revenge. She seeks to ruin the wealthy and powerful Corona family but only destroys herself in the process. Emperatriz's vicious schemes drive her lover to suicide and cause the death of Alma Rosa Corona, his wife. Three orphaned daughters survive, who swear vengeance on their parent's death. One of the girls is really Emperatriz's child. Struggling to capture the Corona Fortune, Emperatriz develops a passion for another member of the Corona Family. As the secret unfold, revealing deception and the cruel truth, it affects all those involved in this stirring passionate drama.

Cast 
 Marina Baura as Emperatriz Jurado
 Raúl Amundaray as Alejandro Magno Corona
 Eduardo Serrano as Leonidas León
 Astrid Carolina Herrera as Endrina Lander/Eugenia Sandoval
 Nohely Arteaga as Esther Lander
 Aroldo Betancourt as Dr. Ricardo Montero
 Astrid Gruber as Elena Lander/Helen
 Elba Escobar as Estela "La Gata" Barroso
 Martin Lantigua as Justo Corona
 Gladys Caceres as Bertha Guaiquepuro
 Nury Flores as Perfecta Jurado
 Arturo Peniche as David León
 Pedro Lander as Mauricio Gómez
 Betty Ruth as Mamama
 Lino Ferrer as Cándido
 Fernando Flores as Manuel
 Alma Ingianni as Margot
 Eric Noriega as Urbano Guevara
 Luis Rivas as Napoleón
 Yajaira Paredes as Juana Velásquez
 Veronica Doza as Lola
 William Moreno as Benito Palermo
 Juan Carlos Gardie as Jaime Peraza
 Alberto de Mozos as Mauro
 Julio Pereira as Gonzalo Ustáriz

References

External links
Emperatriz at the Internet Movie Database

1990 telenovelas
Venezuelan telenovelas
1990 Venezuelan television series debuts
1990 Venezuelan television series endings
Spanish-language telenovelas
Venevisión telenovelas
Television shows set in Venezuela